The Gull Island vole (Microtus pennsylvanicus nesophilus) is a subspecies of the meadow vole last collected in 1897. A ground-dwelling coastal beach grass herbivore endemic to Great Gull Island, New York, it disappeared after habitat destruction for naval fortifications in August 1898 for the Spanish–American War. Feral cats were also partly responsible in its decline.  It is known from fifteen specimens in Washington, D.C.

References

External links
 Extinction: Gull Island Vole UWSP GEOG358 (Heywood)

Extinct rodents
Extinct animals of the United States
Rodent extinctions since 1500
Species made extinct by human activities
Microtus
Mammals described in 1898